Barry John Conn (Barry Conn, born 1948), is an Australian botanist.  He was awarded a Ph.D. from Adelaide University in 1982 for work on Prostanthera.

Career 
Conn's first appointment as a botanist was with  the Lae Herbarium in 1974. He then became  herbarium curator and a lecturer at the Papua New Guinea Forestry College, Bulolo (1976–1979).  He is a scientific advisor to the Food and Agriculture Organisation. In Australia, he has been senior botanist at the National Herbarium of Victoria (1982–1987), and botanist (and principal research scientist) at the National Herbarium of New South Wales (1987–2015). In 1994-1995, he was Australian Botanical Liaison Officer at Kew. While with the National Herbarium of New South Wales, he managed the Australia’s Virtual Herbarium Project for New South Wales, and was scientific editor of the journal Telopea from 2013 to 2015.

Some published names

Acacia aureocrinita B.J.Conn & Tame, Austral. Syst. Bot. 9(6): 851 (1996) (1996).
Acacia cremiflora B.J.Conn & Tame, Austral. Syst. Bot. 9(6): 853 (1996) (1996).
Actephila forsteri B.J.Conn, Telopea 20: 11 (2017).
Dasymalla chorisepala (Munir) B.J.Conn & Henwood, Austral. Syst. Bot. 24(1): 6 (2011).
Drosera hookeri R.P.Gibson, B.J.Conn & Conran, J. Adelaide Bot. Gard. 24: 41 (2010).
Mentha atrolilacina B.J.Conn & D.J.Duval, Telopea 12(4): 521 (2010)

See IPNI.(Some 174 species listed, not all currently accepted)

Plants named in his honour 
Prostanthera conniana (and in honour of his wife)

Publications 
(incomplete)

Books

Articles

 pdf

References 

Living people
1948 births
University of Adelaide alumni
Australian Botanical Liaison Officers